The women's pentathlon at the 1950 European Athletics Championships was held in Brussels, Belgium, at Heysel Stadium on 25 August 1950.

Medalists

Results

Final
25 August

Participation
According to an unofficial count, 11 athletes from 9 countries participated in the event.

 (1)
 (2)
 (1)
 (2)
 (1)
 (1)
 (1)
 (1)
 (1)

References

Pentathlon
Combined events at the European Athletics Championships
Euro